The Polski Blok Ludowy (PBL) (Polish Peasant Bloc) was a short lived political party in Poland, founded in 2002 by dissenting members from the parliamentary bodies of the Polish People's Party (PSL) and Self-Defense of the Polish Republic (Samoobrona). Its leader was Wojciech Mojzesowicz. 

The PBL functioned as a political grouping until January 2005. Thereafter the group splintered and its representatives joined various other political parties.

Among the Bloc's former parliamentary representatives were: Wacław Klukowski (Szczecin constituency), Piotr Smolana (Bielsko-Biała) and Mojzesowicz himself (Bydgoszcz)

References

2002 establishments in Poland
2005 disestablishments in Poland
Agrarian parties in Poland
Conservative parties in Poland
Catholic political parties
Defunct political parties in Poland
Political parties disestablished in 2005
Political parties established in 2002